Aileen Kirkpatrick Adams  (born 5 September 1923) is a British retired consultant anaesthetist.

Early life
Aileen Adams was born on 5 September 1923. She graduated from the University of Sheffield.

Career
Adams worked as a junior anaesthetist at Addenbrooke's Hospital from 1946 to 1951); as a senior registrar in Bristol from 1952 to 1955; a fellow in anaesthesia at Massachusetts General Hospital from 1955 to 1957; as a locum consultant in Oxford from 1958 to 1959); as a senior lecturer at Lagos University Medical School from 1963 to 1964), and was appointed a consultant anaesthetist back at Addenbrooke' from 1960 to 1984.

She was also an associate lecturer at Cambridge University from 1967 1o 1984.

She was dean of the Faculty of Anaesthetists of the Royal College of Surgeons (later the Royal College of Anaesthetists) from 1985 to 1988.

History of medicine
She served as president of the History of Anaesthesia Society from 1990 to 1992, of the History of Medicine Society of the Royal Society of Medicine from 1994 to 1995; and of the British Society for the History of Medicine from 2003 to 2005.

Honours
She was made a Commander of the Order of the British Empire (CBE), and elected a Fellow of the Royal College of Surgeons (FRCS) and a Fellow of the Royal College of Anaesthetists (FRCA).

Interviews

References

External links 
 
 65 Years of Anaesthesia in the NHS - video featuring Adams

`

1923 births
Living people
Place of birth missing (living people)
Academics of the University of Cambridge
Alumni of the University of Sheffield
British anaesthetists
British consultants
British expatriates in Nigeria
British women academics
Commanders of the Order of the British Empire
Fellows of the Royal College of Anaesthetists
Fellows of the Royal College of Surgeons
Academic staff of the University of Lagos
British medical historians
Presidents of the History of Medicine Society
British expatriates in the United States
Women anesthesiologists